Darius Jokarzadeh (born ) is a Welsh male weightlifter, competing in the +105 kg category.

Jokarzadeh was born in Cardiff to an Iranian father. He attended Ysgol Gyfun Gymraeg Glantaf, a secondary school that teaches through the medium of Welsh. He was a sport rower before taking up weightlifting.

As a junior he set an overall British records in Olympic weightlifting in the clean & jerk, lifting 215 kg at the World Junior Championships in Lima, Peru on 10 May 2013. He represented Wales at the 2014 Commonwealth Games in the +105 kg event.

Major competitions

References

1993 births
Living people
Welsh male weightlifters
Place of birth missing (living people)
Weightlifters at the 2014 Commonwealth Games
Commonwealth Games competitors for Wales